Carmine Cucciniello (born 27 December 1988 in Avellino) is an Italian football player. He currently plays for Arezzo.

Club career

Early career
Cucciniello was born in Avellino on 27 December 1988 and started playing football in the youth team of Avellino, the club of his hometown. He went on to make his professional debut, aged 17, as a starter in a Coppa Italia game against Albinoleffe, on 19 August 2006.

Sampdoria
During the January 2007 transfer window, Serie A club Sampdoria signed Cucciniello in a temporary deal, with option to buy at the end of the season. At the beginning of the 2007–08 campaign, Cucciniello was bought by Sampdoria and during that season he won, with the Primavera team, which is now an under-19 team, a Scudetto Primavera.
He never made his first team and Serie A debut with Samp, but he was sent on loan in lower Italian division teams to improve, such as Perugia.

Loans
Cucciniello was sent for the 2008/09 season on a temporary deal to Perugia, but he didn't have a lot of luck, because of his young age. For this reason, during the January 2009 transfer window he was sent on another loan to Paganese, closer to his hometown.
He stayed to Paganese for the season 2009/10, too.

Fondi
At the beginning of 2010/2011 season Cucciniello signed a 3-year contract with Fondi, after his contract with Sampdoria had expired.

Casertana
For the season 2013/14 Carmine Cucciniello played for Casertana. At the end of the season his team was admitted in Lega Pro Prima Divisione after a second place in Lega Pro Seconda Divisione.

Arezzo
For the season 2014/15 Cucciniello signed for Arezzo.

References

External links
 

1988 births
Living people
Italian footballers
U.S. Avellino 1912 players
U.C. Sampdoria players
A.C. Perugia Calcio players
S.S. Arezzo players
Sportspeople from the Province of Avellino
Association football midfielders
Footballers from Campania